Jaros, Baum & Bolles (JB&B) is an American MEP (Mechanical, electrical, and plumbing) and consulting engineering firm founded in 1915 by Alfred L. Jaros, Jr. and Albert L. Baum. The firm is best known for high-rise projects, including One World Trade Center and Hudson Yards in New York City, the Willis Tower (formerly Sears Tower) in Chicago, and the Bank of China Tower in Hong Kong. In 2020, JB&B was named New York’s Design Firm of the Year by Engineering-News Record magazine.

History 
In 1915, mechanical engineers Alfred L. Jaros, Jr. and Albert L. Baum, recent graduates of Columbia University’s engineering program, left their internships with a large consulting firm and founded Jaros and Baum. In 1932, Frederick Bolles joined them, bringing plumbing design to the firm. The company’s longevity has allowed it to claim a number of engineering firsts, including what is believed to be the first sprinkler system for a high-rise building (Willis Tower, opened as the Sears Tower in 1974) and the first high-speed elevators (original World Trade Center in New York City, opened 1973). In February 2022, the firm created the Deep Carbon Reduction Group, which helps building owners and operators navigate new policies and regulations for reducing carbon emissions in urban settings.

Selected projects 
 111 West 57th Street, New York, NY
 Bank of America Tower (Manhattan), New York, NY
 Bank of China Tower, Hong Kong
 Memorial Hospital, New York, NY
 Moynihan Train Hall, New York, NY
 NASCAR Hall of Fame, Charlotte, NC
 National September 11 Memorial & Museum, New York, NY
 One Vanderbilt, New York, NY
 One World Trade Center, New York, NY
 Pan Am Building, New York, NY
 Seagram Building, New York, NY
 Sony Center, Berlin, Germany
 TWA Flight Center at JFK International Airport, New York, NY
 Whitney Museum of American Art, New York, NY
 Willis Tower, Chicago, IL
 World Trade Center (1973-2001), New York, NY

Notable alumni 

 Donald E. Ross, former managing partner, member of the National Academy of Engineering

References

External links
 Company website
 ACEC-NY Engineering Firm Directory

Engineering consulting firms of the United States
1915 establishments in New York (state)